Khan Abdul Hamid Khan was an Azad Kashmiri politician who served as 1st Prime Minister of Azad Kashmir from June 1975 to August 1977. He also served as President of Azad Jammu and Kashmir from 7 August 1964 to 7 October 1969. His brother Abdul Qayyum Khan well known Pakistani politician who served as Chief Minister of Khyber Pakhtunkhwa and  Interior Minister of Pakistan.

References

Prime Ministers of Azad Kashmir
Pakistani people of Kashmiri descent
Possibly living people
Year of birth missing